Huddersfield Town's 1985–86 campaign was another disappointing season for the Terriers, with the team struggling for consistency and survival in the Second Division, until the arrival of Scottish striker Duncan Shearer from Chelsea near the end of the season saw Town guarantee their status in 16th place.

Squad at the start of the season

Review
Town had a good start to the season with Dale Tempest becoming the first and so far only Town player to score a hat-trick on the opening day of a league season in Town's 4–3 win over Millwall. He was top scorer with 12 goals, even though he was on loan at Gillingham in the latter part of the season, before moving to Lokeren in Belgium at the end of the season.

Between October and December, Town went on a run of 10 consecutive matches without a win, which saw Town hover dangerously above the relegation zone for most of the season. Following that they went on a run of only 1 defeat in 8 matches, followed by a run of 5 losses in 6, which forced manager Mick Buxton to bring in a new striker.

In came Chelsea striker Duncan Shearer, who scored a hat-trick on his full debut in Town's 3–1 win over Barnsley. That coupled with three other wins saw Town finish in 16th place, just 6 points and 3 places above the relegation zone.

Squad at the end of the season

Results

Division Two

FA Cup

League Cup

Appearances and goals

1985-86
English football clubs 1985–86 season